Irene Skliva  (Irini Skliva; Greek: Ειρήνη Σκλήβα; born 4 April 1978, in Athens, Greece) is a Greek model and beauty queen who was crowned Miss World 1996 in India.

Miss World
After winning the title of "Miss Hellas" at the Miss Star Hellas pageant, she represented Greece in Bangalore, India during the highly regarded Miss World pageant in 1996 and was selected as Miss World 1996.

As an 18-year-old woman, she could not quite believe it was real: "I had the feeling it was just another rehearsal - in the rehearsals, in one rehearsal, they'd used me as the mock winner".

Life after Miss World
After completing her year as Miss World, Skliva returned to Greece where she pursued a career in television and modeling, her face appearing on the covers of numerous Greek magazines such as Diva and LipStick. She has participated in some of the world's largest fashion shows in Athens, Milan and Munich. She is represented by Ace Models Agency.

Personal life
She got married in September 2002 and had her first daughter, in July 2003.

During the 2004 Summer Olympics, Skliva (like numerous other celebrities) left her signature on The Olive: The Tree of Athens, a sculptured olive tree located in the Water Plaza fun park which visitors flooded during the games, that represented the homecoming of the Olympics.

External links
Ace Models Management

1978 births
Models from Athens
Greek female models
Living people
Miss World winners
Miss World 1996 delegates
Greek beauty pageant winners